Aware Electronics Corp. is a United States of America designer and manufacturer of radiation monitors and Geiger Counters. It is located in Wilmington, Delaware and was incorporated in 1986

It produces the RM series of radiation monitors, which include the RM-60, RM-70, RM-80 and the RM-G90

Aware Electronics Corp. is notable in that it was the first company to design, manufacture and market a Geiger Counter and software specifically designed to operate with personal computers.  A review of its original product, the RM-60, appeared in the November 1989 edition of PC Magazine  A 1996 review of its RM-60 appeared in the June 1995 edition of Computer Life

It also produces the LCD-90 MicroController - Data Logger for use in conjunction with its radiation monitors

The remainder of this article concerns itself with Aware Electronics Inc., Ltd, a Taiwanese company, now defunct, which has no relationship what-so-ever with Aware Electronics Corp.

Aware Electronics Inc., Ltd
Aware Electronics Inc., Ltd was a Taiwanese electronics manufacturer. It was established in 2006 with the guidance and assistance of the Institute for Information Industry.

It produced the A-BOOK series, which includes the A-View and AW-300 models (2008). The earlier model AW-150 was sold in the US as the MiTYBOOK.

A-View
is described by Aware as An advanced digital photo frame with the features of a standard PC.

A sub-notebook similar to and probably the basis for the Elonex ONE. It seems to be a development of the similar AW-300 sub-notebook.

Hardware
CPU: Aday5F 300 MHz X86
Memory: 
128/256 MB DDR2 SDRAM
4 MB Flash ROM
1 GB/2GB NAND FLASH
Display: 800x480 7” TFT LCD
Network interface: 
Ethernet 10/100 Mbit/s
Wi-Fi 802.11b/g (optional)
Bluetooth (optional)
Webcam 2.0M pixels (optional)
USB 2.0/1.1 port X 2
Audio jack: 3.5 mm in/out
Battery: 3 cells, 2200mAH/cell
Weight: 950g (with keyboard)
Dimension(WxLxH) 230 mm x 146 mm x 33 mm(with keyboard)

AW-300

A sub-notebook similar to the A-View. The Operating system is a proprietary LINOS 2.4.25. It includes educational software, GQView, Sylpheed (email), Beaver (a text based editor), VNC and Tux Typing and games such as Xblock out, Xbomb, Xdigger, Xgalaga, Xscavenger.

Hardware
CPU: Aday5F 300 MHz X86
Memory: 
128MB DDR2 SDRAM
4MB Flash ROM
1 GB NAND Flash
Display: 800x480 7" TFT LCD monitor
Network: 
10/100 Mbit/s Ethernet
Wi-Fi 802.11g(optional)
bluetooth (optional)
USB 2.0 ports x 6
Audio Jack: 3.5 mm audio jack
Volume control: volume knob
Input： Keyboard, mouse
Storage： USB diskdrive, Card reader

AW-150

A sub-notebook similar to, and probably the basis for, the MiTYBOOK.

Hardware
CPU: 150 MHz X86 (possibly Aday5E)
Memory: 
64 MB SDRAM
4MB Flash ROM
1 GB NAND Flash
Display: 800x480  TFT LCD monitor
Network: 10/100 Mbit/s Ethernet
USB 2.0 port x 6
Audio Jack: 3.5 mm audio jack
Volume control: volume knob
Input：Keyboard, mouse
Storage：USB diskdrive, Card reader

References 

Linux-based devices
Electronics companies established in 2006